"Children" is a song written by Joe South, originally from his 1969 album Don't It Make You Want to Go Home?. In 1970, he released it as a single.

The song became a hit in the U.S. (#48) and Canadian (#33) pop charts. It was a bigger hit on the Adult Contemporary charts of both nations.

Chart history

Johnny Cash version 

The song was recorded by Johnny Cash for the 20th Century Fox film The Gospel Road and its double soundtrack album of the same name. Released as a single in 1973 (Columbia 4-45786, with "Last Supper" from the same album on the opposite side), Cash's version of "Children" reached number 30 on U.S. Billboard country chart.

Track listing

Charts

References

External links 
 "Children" on the Johnny Cash official website
 
 

1969 songs
1970 songs
1973 singles
Joe South songs
Johnny Cash songs
Songs written by Joe South
Columbia Records singles
Capitol Records singles
Songs about children